Megachile davidsoni is a species of bee in the family Megachilidae. It was described by Theodore Dru Alison Cockerell in 1902.

Location
Megachile davidsoni can be found in the south-west of California, United States.

References

Davidsoni
Insects described in 1902